Felister Aloyce Bura (born November 9, 1959) is a Member of Parliament in the National Assembly of Tanzania. She is a member of Chama Cha Mapinduzi (Party of the Revolution).

References

External links
 Profile on the Parliament of Tanzania website

Living people
Members of the National Assembly (Tanzania)
1959 births
Place of birth missing (living people)